The Slough–Windsor & Eton line is a branch railway line  long, in Berkshire, England. At its northern end, the branch line joins the Great Western Main Line, but passenger trains from Windsor rarely use the connection, usually terminating at Slough.

Services
A 20-minute service interval in each direction is operated by Great Western Railway using the dedicated bay platform 1 at Slough.

Rolling stock
Although the Great Western Main Line is electrified, the Windsor Branch is not. Services on it are provided by Class 165 and Class 166 2- and 3-car diesel multiple units (DMUs).

In the 1970s and 1980s, DMUs such as the Class 117 and Class 121 ('Bubblecars') were used.

Electrification

Electrification of the Slough to Windsor route was approved in 2014, but on 8 November 2016, it was announced that the electrification of the branch was being delayed, without a revised forecast date.

History

The line opened, despite opposition from Eton College, on 8 October 1849.  It was built as a broad gauge line but dual gauge track was laid in 1862.

For a period from 1863, Metropolitan Railway trains served the line. Between 1 March 1883 and 30 September 1885, the branch was also served by the Metropolitan District Railway.

Slough Junction
Slough Junction was a triangular junction connecting the branch line  to the mainline in both eastbound (towards London) and westbound (towards Reading) directions. It is not known whether it was used for turning complete trains; a turntable was available at  shed for turning locomotives. The layout of the junction was complicated, as the east curve ran between sidings of the shed.

Most service trains accessed Slough station by the eastern chord, which remains in use. It is double track, with the "outer" track to the bay platform used by branch-line trains at Slough, and the "inner" track, connected to the mainline, used by empty stock workings and by rare passenger trains.

The western chord, known as the "Royal" or "Queen's" Curve, was little used except by excursion traffic and royal trains (hence its nickname). It was closed through lack of use in 1964 and was used for a time to stable carriages, after which the track was lifted.

All land west of the eastern chord was sold for housing, and there is little evidence of the junction at the site now although aerial photographs show the curving line of the western tracks.

Chalvey Halt

The halt was authorised on 24 February 1929, at an estimated cost of £840, and opened on 6 May 1929. It comprised both "up" and "down" platforms, built from heavy timbers to the standard GWR design for halt platforms. There were also waiting shelters, and steps down to the nearby road.

After only 14 months of operation, Chalvey Halt closed on 7 July 1930.

Windsor Link
The Windsor Link Railway is a proposal to tunnel from Windsor & Eton Central to Windsor & Eton Riverside to create a through railway from Slough to Staines.

References

Further reading

External links

The Railways at Windsor at The Royal Windsor Web Site
slough loco shed 81B 3Q at Flickr
Steam Locomotive Shed 81B Slough at Rail UK
British Railways London Western Region Locomotive Depots 1948–59
Ordnance Survey Popular and New Popular Editions at Vision of Britain

Railway lines in South East England
Rail transport in Berkshire
Transport in Slough
Railway lines opened in 1849
Windsor, Berkshire
1849 establishments in England